Ingrid Bergman (29 August 1915 – 29 August 1982) was a multilingual, Academy Award-winning actress born in Stockholm, conversant in Swedish, German, English, Italian and French. She had been preparing for an acting career all her life. After her mother Frieda died when she was three years old, she was raised by her father Justus Samuel Bergman, a professional photographer who encouraged her to pose and act in front of the camera. As a young woman, she was shy, taller than the average women of her generation, and somewhat overweight. Acting allowed her to transcend these constraints, enabling her to transform herself into a character. She first appeared as an uncredited extra in the film Landskamp (1932) and was accepted into the Royal Dramatic Theatre of Stockholm as a scholarship student in 1933. 

She appeared in a dozen films in Sweden before being offered work in the American film industry. The movie that both she and historians cite as launching her international career was Intermezzo (1936) in which she shared the lead opposite Gösta Ekman. It brought her to the attention of producer David O. Selznick, who purchased the rights to the story and cast her as the female lead in the American version, Intermezzo: A Love Story (1939), with British actor Leslie Howard taking over the male lead. Bergman signed a three-picture contract with the German production company UFA GmbH, intending to launch her career in German films. In the end, she only acted in the comedy The Four Companions (Die vier Gesellen) (1938), directed by Carl Froelich. At the time of filming, she was pregnant with daughter Pia Lindström by her first husband, physician Petter Lindström, and performed with her abdomen bound. Following her daughter's birth, she made the Swedish film June Night (1940), and three American films: Adam Had Four Sons (1941), Rage in Heaven (1941), and Dr. Jekyll and Mr. Hyde (1942).

Bergman made over 40 films in her career, many of them for American producers and directors. In the early stages of making the World War II romantic drama  Casablanca (1942), she and her co-stars Humphrey Bogart and Paul Henreid thought it would be an insignificant film, and all three wanted out of their commitments to the production. The script was a work in progress, with director Michael Curtiz in frequent conflict with the writers and with producer Hal B. Wallis. The actors and Curtiz were crafting the characters and story line as they went along. After its release, the film struck a chord with wartime audiences. It was nominated for eight Academy Awards, winning in the categories of Best Picture, Best Director, and Best Screenplay. For decades afterwards, there were special screenings and retrospectives of the film, often with Bergman as a guest speaker. She had attended so many events for the film, being asked the same questions over and over, that she once remarked, "When I die, I hope they won't show it again".

Alfred Hitchcock directed her in three films: Spellbound (1945), Notorious (1946), and Under Capricorn (1949). Impressed by Italian director Roberto Rossellini's films Rome, Open City (1945) and Paisà (1946), she wrote to him offering her services as an actress. Together, they would make Stromboli (1950), Europa 51 (1951), Siamo donne (1953), Journey to Italy (1954), and Joan of Arc at the Stake (1954). Her off-screen relationship with Rossellini ended her marriage to Lindström, and produced out-of-wedlock son Renato Roberto Ranaldo Giusto Giuseppe ("Robin") Rossellini. She and Lindström divorced in 1950, and she married Rossellini. After the 1952 births of their twin daughters Isotta Ingrid and Isabella, she and Rossellini divorced.  Hitchcock had remained her lifelong friend, and told her, "He ruined your career". 

Bergman married for a final time in 1958, to Swedish film producer Lars Schmidt. He produced her works of 24 Hours in a Woman's Life (1960-TV), The Human Voice (1960-TV), and Hedda Gabler (1962-Stage play; 1963-TV). They divorced in 1975.

She was the recipient of numerous global nominations and awards for her work, including three Academy Awards. In the category of Best Actress, she won for  Gaslight (1944) and  Anastasia (1956). For  Murder on the Orient Express (1974), she was named Best Supporting Actress.  She appeared multiple times on the American stage. In the pre-television era, she was a prolific guest on radio programs. Bergman received a star on the Hollywood Walk of Fame on 8 February 1960. 

A Woman Called Golda on American television earned her the 1982 Primetime Emmy Award for Outstanding Lead Actress in a Miniseries or a Movie. When asked to play Israeli Prime Minister Golda Meir, Bergman doubted that the audience would accept her–a tall Swedish Protestant–in the part, but producer Gene Corman and director Alan Gibson believed that on screen she generated the same feeling of public trust as did Meir. She was in the last stages of her battle with breast cancer when shooting commenced, making her un-insurable for the production, but all concerned believed the project was worth the risk. The film premiered on American television on 26 April 1982. Four months later, Bergman died on her birthday. Her daughter Pia accepted the Emmy award on her behalf.

Films

Television

Theatre

Radio

Audio recordings

See also
List of awards and nominations received by Ingrid Bergman

Bibliography

Notes

References

External links
Ingrid Bergman at IBDB
Ingrid Bergman on the Swedish Film Database

Bergman, Ingrid